Selagia fuscorubra is a species of snout moth. It is found in France.

References

Moths described in 1928
Phycitini
Moths of Europe